Democracy Park is a historic park located in Central Park,  Jung District, Busan, South Korea. It was established in October 16, 1999 to commemorate the sacrifices of April Revolution, Busan–Masan Democracy Movement and June Democracy Movement.

References

External links 
 

1999 establishments in South Korea
Parks in Busan
Jung District, Busan